Stark County may refer to:

Stark County, Illinois
Stark County, North Dakota
Stark County, Ohio

See also
Starke County, Indiana